James M. Caruthers is an American chemical engineer, currently Gerald and Sarah Skidmore Professor of Chemical Engineering at Purdue University and an Elected Fellow of the American Physical Society. Caruthers got his S.B., S.M., and Ph.D. (all in chemistry) from Massachusetts Institute of Technology in 1975, 1976 and 1977, respectively.

References

20th-century births
Living people
Massachusetts Institute of Technology School of Science alumni
Purdue University faculty
Fellows of the American Physical Society
21st-century American physicists
Year of birth missing (living people)
Place of birth missing (living people)